Marina Yurchenya (born 9 November 1959) is a Soviet former breaststroke swimmer who competed in the 1976 Summer Olympics.

References

1959 births
Living people
Ukrainian female breaststroke swimmers
Olympic swimmers of the Soviet Union
Swimmers at the 1976 Summer Olympics
Olympic silver medalists for the Soviet Union
European Aquatics Championships medalists in swimming
Medalists at the 1976 Summer Olympics
Olympic silver medalists in swimming
Soviet female breaststroke swimmers